Salvador Luis Reyes de la Peña (born 28 September 1968) is a Mexican former footballer and current manager of Liga MX club Santos Laguna. He is the son of former footballer Salvador Reyes Monteón.

Career
Reyes was appointed as director of youth football for Santos Laguna on 19 December 2017. On 8 August 2018, Santos announced Reyes would take charge of the first team after Robert Siboldi's resignation.

Managerial statistics

References

External links

1968 births
Living people
Mexican footballers
Club Puebla players
C.D. Guadalajara footballers
Mexican football managers
Association footballers not categorized by position